Barbara Jane Newman is an American medievalist, literary critic, religious historian, and author. She is Professor of English and Religion, and John Evans Professor of Latin, at Northwestern University. Newman was elected in 2017 to the American Philosophical Society.

Education and career
Newman was raised near Chicago, Illinois. After an undergraduate education at Oberlin College and graduate work at the University of Chicago, she began her scholarly career with a 1981 dissertation at Yale on Hildegard of Bingen.

She has written on issues of gender and identity in a broad range of literary and theological texts, as well as translating important works from Latin, French, and Middle High German. Her scholarship has explored figures such as Julian of Norwich, Heloise and Abelard, Thomas of Cantimpré, Mechthild of Hackeborn, Marguerite Porete, Henry Suso, and Guillaume de Lorris. She has been described as "one of the finest Hildegard scholars". Her 2003 book, God and the Goddesses: Vision, Poetry, and Belief in the Middle Ages suggested that medieval Christianity included multiple female figures, "distinctive creations of the Christian imagination", who deepened the medieval vision of God. Her book was praised in Speculum as a "provocatively and eloquently written study" in which "Newman has directed her lifelong passion for the feminine in medieval Christian literature toward a finely tuned reading of female figures" as Goddesses; Caroline Walker Bynum wrote that when "we look back fifty years from now, we will see this book as one that changed the face of scholarship and maybe even our understanding of Christianity itself." In 2006 Newman published a study and translation of the Song of Songs or Marienleich of Heinrich Frauenlob, which was described in The Times Literary Supplement as being "a gorgeous publication, clearly and forcefully written, stunningly laid out and carefully edited." In 2015 she was elected to a one-year term as President of the Medieval Academy of America.

Awards
Newman was elected in 2005 to the American Academy of Arts and Sciences.
In 2008 she was awarded an Andrew W. Mellon Foundation Distinguished Achievement Award, currently the most valuable award in the humanities. In 2009 she was awarded the Charles Homer Haskins Medal by the Medieval Academy of America, for God and the Goddesses. Her research has been supported by the National Endowment for the Humanities, the Rockefeller Foundation, and the Guggenheim Foundation. Medieval Crossover: Reading the Secular against the Sacred (2014) has been named a Choice Outstanding Academic Book for 2014.

Works
 Sister of Wisdom: St. Hildegard's Theology of the Feminine (1987) 
 From Virile Woman to WomanChrist: Studies in Medieval Religion and Literature (1995) 
 Symphonia: A Critical Edition of the Symphonia Armonie Celestium Revelationum (1998)
 God and the Goddesses: Vision, Poetry, and Belief in the Middle Ages (2003) 
 Frauenlob’s Song of Songs: A Medieval German Poet and His Masterpiece (2006) 
 Thomas of Cantimpré: The Collected Saints' Lives: Abbot John of Cantimpré, Christina the Astonishing, Margaret of Ypres, and Lutgard of Aywières (2008)
 Medieval Crossover: Reading the Secular Against the Sacred (2013) 
 Making Love in the Twelfth Century: "Letters of Two Lovers" in Context (2016)
 Mechthild of Hackeborn and the Nuns of Helfta: The Book of Special Grace (2017)
 The Works of Richard Methley (2021)
 The Permeable Self: Five Medieval Relationships (2021)

References

External links
 Barbara Newman's publications on Northwestern Scholars
 Barbara Newman's Academia.edu page
 Barbara Newman's CV
 "Medieval Romance and the Pagan Imaginary", Berfrois
 "Astonishing Heloise", a review of The Letter Collection of Peter Abelard and Heloise, ed. David Luscombe, in the London Review of Books

American literary critics
Women literary critics
American medievalists
Women medievalists
Northwestern University faculty
Living people
Chaucer scholars
Writers from Illinois
Yale University alumni
20th-century American writers
21st-century American non-fiction writers
Fellows of the American Academy of Arts and Sciences
Oberlin College alumni
University of Chicago alumni
Fellows of the Medieval Academy of America
Members of the American Philosophical Society
American women historians
Year of birth missing (living people)
Presidents of the American Society of Church History
21st-century American women writers
American women critics